Ailinginae Atoll (Marshallese:) is an uninhabited (due to Castle Bravo nuclear testing) coral atoll of 25 islands in the Pacific Ocean, on the northern end of the Ralik Chain of the Marshall Islands. The two entrances into the lagoon are 'Mogiri Pass' and 'Eniibukku Pass'.

The average temperature of these islands is about  during daytime and slightly warmer during night-time due to cold weather associated with rain showers during daytime. The rainy season is from September through November. The island is covered with 29 species of plants scrub, grasses and some stands of Pisonia grandis trees.

History

The first sighting recorded by Europeans was by the Spanish navigator Álvaro de Saavedra on 1 January 1528. Together with Utirik Atoll and Rongelap Atoll, they were charted as Islas de los Reyes (Islands of the Three Wise Kings in Spanish) due to the proximity of Epiphany

Ailinginae Atoll was claimed by the Empire of Germany along with the rest of the Marshall Islands in 1884. After World War I, the island came under the South Seas Mandate of the Empire of Japan. Following the end of World War II, it came under the control of the United States as part of the Trust Territory of the Pacific Islands until the independence of the Marshall Islands in 1986. Ailinginae Atoll has been uninhabited since 1954 when the few islanders were evacuated due to nuclear fallout fears from the Castle Bravo test at Bikini Atoll
to the northwest.

See also

 Also contaminated by Castle Bravo test: Rongelap Atoll, Utirik Atoll, Rongerik Atoll
 Desert island
 List of islands

References 

 Ailinginae Atoll Fact Sheet

External links

 Marshall Islands site
 Map of Ailinginae Atoll 1893
 Geography of the Marshall Islands, including Ailinginae Atoll

Atolls of the Marshall Islands
Ralik Chain
Former populated places in Oceania
Uninhabited islands of the Marshall Islands